Sluiskin Mountain is a prominent pair of summits located in Mount Rainier National Park in Pierce County of Washington state. It is situated northwest of Burroughs Mountain and is part of the Cascade Range. The higher rocky peak is known as The Chief (7026 ft), and the second peak to the west is known as The Squaw (6960+ ft). West of The Squaw are pinnacles called The Papooses. Sluiskin was the native American guide who assisted with the first successful ascent of Mount Rainier by Hazard Stevens and P. B. Van Trump in 1870. Sluiskin Falls within the park also honors him.

Climate

Sluiskin Mountain is located in the marine west coast climate zone of western North America. Most weather fronts originate in the Pacific Ocean, and travel northeast toward the Cascade Mountains. As fronts approach, they are forced upward by the peaks of the Cascade Range (Orographic lift), causing them to drop their moisture in the form of rain or snowfall onto the Cascades. As a result, the west side of the Cascades experiences high precipitation, especially during the winter months in the form of snowfall. During winter months, weather is usually cloudy, but, due to high pressure systems over the Pacific Ocean that intensify during summer months, there is often little or no cloud cover during the summer. Because of maritime influence, snow tends to be wet and heavy, resulting in high avalanche danger. Precipitation runoff from Sluiskin Mountain drains into tributaries of the White River.

See also

 Geology of the Pacific Northwest

References

External links
 Weather forecast: Sluiskin Mountain
 National Park Service web site: Mount Rainier National Park

Gallery

Cascade Range
Mountains of Pierce County, Washington
Mountains of Washington (state)
Mount Rainier National Park
North American 2000 m summits